Ma Mhe Wae Nae Kin Aung Nay is a Burmese drama television series. It aired on MRTV-4, from 16 November 2020 to 11 January 2021, on Mondays to Fridays at 19:00 for  41 episodes.

Cast
Thar Htet Nyan Zaw as Dite
Nay Myo Aung as U Phay Khin
Htoo Khant Kyaw as U Baydar
Wai Lar Ri as Saung
Nyi Nyi Min Htet as Thet Oo
Thuta Aung as Kywet
Kaung Sit Thway as Zaw Ye
Khun Nay Chi Cho as Kay Thi
Min Thu as U Kyaw Soe
Aye Thida as Daw Hnin Khine
Wai Lu as U Htun Thet
Mo Khan as Daw Wai Mar

References

Burmese television series
MRTV (TV network) original programming